RCAF Stadium (Royal Cambodia Armed Forces Stadium), also known as the Old Stadium or Lambert Stadium, is a stadium in Phnom Penh, Cambodia. It has a capacity of 8,000 spectators. It is the home stadium of National Defense Ministry FC of the Cambodian League. The stadium also hosts matches of the Cambodia national football team.

References

Football venues in Cambodia
Rugby union stadiums in Asia
Buildings and structures in Phnom Penh
Sport in Phnom Penh